Keith Usherwood Ingold,  (born 31 May 1929) is a British chemist.

He was born to Sir Christopher Ingold and Dr. Hilda Usherwood, and studied for a BSc in Chemistry at the University of London, completing his degree in 1949. He continued his higher education with a PhD in chemistry at Oxford University, which he completed in 1951. Soon after graduation he moved to Canada to begin work with the National Research Council, followed by two years of post-doctoral research at the University of British Columbia. He returned to work for the NRC in 1955 as a research officer, followed by a promotion to head of the Free Radical Chemistry Section. He was awarded the 1968 Petroleum Chemistry Award, the 1988 Linus Pauling Award, and both the Davy Medal and Royal Medal of the Royal Society, the latter for "elucidating the mechanism of reactions involving free radicals". In 1995 he was made an officer of the Order of Canada. He has received honorary degrees from the universities of Guelph, Mount Allison, St Andrews, Carleton, McMaster and Dalhousie.

In recent years, his work has focused on radical-trapping antioxidants, vitamin E in particular, and their effect on aging and on preventing such age-related diseases as cancer.

Selected works

References

1929 births
Living people
Alumni of the University of London
British chemists
Royal Medal winners
Officers of the Order of Canada
Fellows of the Royal Society
Fellows of the Royal Society of Canada
20th-century British chemists
21st-century British chemists